Binalot is a method of wrapping and serving food in the Philippines using banana leaves and alike. The term is derived from the root word balot (wrap) + -in- meaning "wrapped".

See also
Pastil
Pusô
Suman
Bibingka
Puto Bumbong

Philippine cuisine